Irvin B. Servold (born 14 November 1932) is a Canadian former Nordic combined and cross-country skier who competed in the 1956 Winter Olympics and in the 1960 Winter Olympics.

References

1932 births
Living people
Canadian male cross-country skiers
Olympic cross-country skiers of Canada
Nordic combined skiers at the 1956 Winter Olympics
Nordic combined skiers at the 1960 Winter Olympics
Cross-country skiers at the 1960 Winter Olympics